Ilias Pollalis (born 19 November 1992) is a Greek football defender who started from Olympiacos's and Panionios's Academies. Ilias is a left footed center back and left back also. He last played for Chalkida.

External links
 
 

1992 births
Living people
Footballers from Athens
Greek footballers
Greek expatriate footballers
Expatriate footballers in the Czech Republic
FK Čáslav players
A.O. Glyfada players
Expatriate footballers in India
Expatriate footballers in Belgium
Mumbai City FC players
Indian Super League players
Association football defenders